The 2006–07 A1 Grand Prix of Nations, Great Britain was an A1 Grand Prix race, held on 29 April 2007 at Brands Hatch, Great Britain. This was the eleventh and final race in the 2006–07 A1 Grand Prix season and the second meeting held at the circuit.

Results

Sprint Race results
The Sprint Race took place on Sunday, 29 April 2007

Feature Race results
The Feature Race took place on Sunday, 29 April 2007

Total Points

 Fastest Lap:

References

Great Britain
A1 Grand Prix